Jakub Kovář (born 19 July 1988) is a Czech professional ice hockey goaltender who is currently playing for HC Sparta Praha in the Czech Extraliga. He was selected by the Philadelphia Flyers in the 4th round (109th overall) of the 2006 NHL Entry Draft. He is the older brother of Jan Kovář.

Playing career
Kovar played major junior hockey in the North American Ontario Hockey League with the Windsor Spitfires. He later returned home to continue his professional career with  HC České Budějovice in the Czech Extraliga. He has also played for ZSC Lions in the National League (NL).

He has also played in the Kontinental Hockey League (KHL) with the Severstal Cherepovets and Avtomobilist Yekaterinburg.

International play
Kovar participated at the 2011 IIHF World Championship as a member of the Czech Republic men's national ice hockey team.

References

External links

1988 births
Living people
Avtomobilist Yekaterinburg players
Czech ice hockey goaltenders
Motor České Budějovice players
SK Horácká Slavia Třebíč players
Ice hockey players at the 2014 Winter Olympics
Olympic ice hockey players of the Czech Republic
Oshawa Generals players
Sportspeople from Písek
Philadelphia Flyers draft picks
Severstal Cherepovets players
HC Tábor players
Windsor Spitfires players
ZSC Lions players
HC Sparta Praha players
Czech expatriate ice hockey players in Russia
Czech expatriate ice hockey players in Canada
Czech expatriate ice hockey players in Switzerland